Golla Oy is a Finnish design company making cases and bags for urban lifestyle. One of the central aspects of Golla's products is their unique design. Golla products have been sold in more than 100 countries. Currently Golla has offices in Finland, Germany and China. The company's headquarters is located in Helsinki, Finland, where the product design also occurs.

History
Golla was established in the small rural town of Kolla, Finland in 1994, where it began producing design items such as CD stands and racks. One of these early models was sold in the gift shop of the Museum of Modern Art in New York City. Golla later designed protective cases for mobile phones. Its established collection helped draw Nokia as a partner, and Golla became a subcontractor. After working with Nokia, Golla shifted its focus to carry solutions for all kinds of portable devices. Today Golla's products are sold around the world.

Products
Golla releases annually a new collection consisting of bags, backpacks and sleeves for laptops from 11" to 17". The collections also include a range of cases for mobile phones.

References

External links
Golla homepage
Golla on Facebook
Golla on Twitter

Finnish brands
Design companies of Finland
Bags (fashion)